Prorella gypsata is a moth in the family Geometridae first described by Augustus Radcliffe Grote in 1882. It is found in the US states of Colorado, New Mexico, Arizona and south-western Texas.

The wingspan is about 18 mm. The forewings are creamy white. In the median area, there is a large, elongated, rectangular, costal patch which descends inward across the cell and contains an upright, black, discal streak. A narrow, white, outwardly angled band, separates this rectangle from a similarly colored, subapical blotch. The subterminal area is largely smoky brown, the terminal margin lighter brown, the two areas separated by a dentate, white line. The hindwings are white crossed by curved postmedian and subterminal lines. Beyond the latter, the margin is broadly tinged with smoky. Adults have been recorded on wing from May to June and again from August to October, probably in two generations per year.

References

Moths described in 1882
Eupitheciini